Dušan Simović (28 October 1882 – 26 August 1962) was a Yugoslav Serb army general who served as Chief of the General Staff of the Royal Yugoslav Army and as the Prime Minister of Yugoslavia in 1940–1941.

Biography 
Simović, born on 28 October 1882 in Kragujevac, attended elementary school and two years of high school in his hometown. Due to his interest in military matters, he left high school and entered the  Military Academy in Belgrade. He completed the Military Academy course in 1900, when he was promoted to second lieutenant of artillery. He completed the Higher School of the Military Academy in 1905. During the Balkan Wars (1912–13) and during the First World War (1914–1918), he proved an excellent officer. He won promotion in 1913, and again, in 1915, to lieutenant colonel.
At the  Salonika front, he commanded the 7th Infantry Regiment. But even while working in the Salonika front as an infantary commander, Simović was interested in air power and in air defense. Every day he became more and more interested in the works of flight pioneer  Mihailo Petrović (1884-1913), reading Petrović's reports on the Balkan Wars, as well as his studies on aviation. So Simović decided to dedicate his career to  aviation. In 1918, he was named to the delegates of the Serbian government and the Joint Chiefs of Staff at the National Council of Slovenes, Croats and Serbs in Zagreb. Up to the onset of World War II he devoted himself exclusively to aviation.

From May 1938 until 1940 he served as Chief of the General Staff, in which position he replaced General Milutin Nedić. He joined other officers in the  March 1941 coup against the government of Dragiša Cvetković. After the coup, Simović became the new prime minister (27 March 1941). He did not have much time to make his mark on Yugoslav politics: on the wedding day of his daughter, 6 April 1941, Nazi Germany invaded  Yugoslavia, which surrendered on 18 April 1941.

Simović fled Yugoslavia with his family on 15 April 1941. On 28 October 1941 Simović sent a message to the commander of the Chetniks, Draža Mihailović, and urged him to avoid premature actions and to avoid reprisals.

World War II in Europe ended in May 1945; the Constituent Assembly of Yugoslavia, dominated by   Tito, formed the Socialist Federal Republic of Yugoslavia in November 1945. Simović returned to Belgrade from London in June 1945. In 1946 he was a witness for the prosecution in the  trial of Draža Mihailović, and went on to author a number of books on military issues. He died in Belgrade in 1962.

He married Snežana Tadić (1883–1971), a Serbian-Ukrainian-Croatian pharmacist from Valjevo, and daughter of Milorad Tadić (1861–1940), in October 1908. They had three sons and four daughters.

References

Sources 
 

1882 births
1962 deaths
Military personnel from Kragujevac
People from the Kingdom of Serbia
Serbian military personnel of World War I
Prime Ministers of Yugoslavia
Royal Yugoslav Air Force personnel
Army general (Kingdom of Yugoslavia)